Guillermo Sergio Imhoff (born October 11, 1982) is an Argentine football player. The central defender last played for Bali De Vata FC.

Club career
Imhoff started his career playing in the Argentine Primera, where he had spells with Colón de Santa Fe, Huracán de Tres Arroyos and Gimnasia de Jujuy.

He made his debut in the First Division with Colón de Santa Fe on July 5, 2007, scoring the loan goal in a 1–0 victory over Vélez Sársfield. In 2005, he was loaned to Huracán de Tres Arroyos and subsequently to Gimnasia de Jujuy. After gaining experience with those clubs, Imhoff returned to Colón. In 2006, he suffered a serious knee injury which kept him out of action for many months. In 2007, he was loaned to Austrian club Fußballclub Wacker Innsbruck. After two years in Europe, Imhoff received an offer from Bolivian club Jorge Wilstermann and in January 2009 he signed with the aviadores. In January 2010 turned back to Europe and signed for FC Sion a two and a half year deal.

References
 Argentine Primera statistics 

1982 births
Living people
Argentine footballers
Association football defenders
Club Atlético Colón footballers
Gimnasia y Esgrima de Jujuy footballers
C.D. Jorge Wilstermann players
Expatriate footballers in Austria
Expatriate footballers in Bolivia
Expatriate footballers in Indonesia
Expatriate footballers in Switzerland